The Custos Rotulorum of County Wexford was the highest civil officer in County Wexford.

Incumbents

 ?–?1783 Henry Loftus, 1st Earl of Ely (died 1783) 
 1807–?1824 Sir Frederick Flood, 1st Baronet (died 1824) 
 1824-?1845 John Loftus, 2nd Marquess of Ely (died 1845) 
 1845–1858 James Stopford, 4th Earl of Courtown

For later custodes rotulorum, see Lord Lieutenant of Wexford

References

Wexford